George Pol. Papadakis is a Greek poet, writer and mathematician who was born in Athens. He also deals with literary criticism.

Career 

Papadakis is a secondary education teacher in Computer Science, and has also taught in institutes of vocational training. He is a member of the Greek Literary Society and received a prize in prose writing from the Literary Society Parnassos in 2002.  
As a researcher he is engaged in the area of “Entexno” Greek popular music. He also writes verses, some of which set to music by Greek composers including Joseph Benakis and Chrysanthos Mouzakitis. 
Papadakis is Associate Editor of the literary journal Pnevmatiki Zoi (Athens Academy Award – 2002).

Works
 (2001) Anthologia Poiisis. (A Poetry Anthology) Athens: Pnevmatiki Zoi.
 (2001) Enas Peripatos stin Amorgo tou Nikou Gatsou. (A Stroll in Nikos Gatsos's Amorgos, Essay) Athens: Pnevmatiki Zoi.
 (2001) Sta Balkonia tou Ouranou. (At Heaven's Balconies, Poetry) Athens: Pnevmatiki Zoi.
 (2003) Anthologia Poiisis. (A Poetry Anthology) Athens: Pnevmatiki Zoi.
 (2003) To Iparchon Fos. (The Existing Light, Poetry) Athens.
 (2005) Oi Dromoi tou Fantastikou. (The Roads of Fantasy Literature, Stories – Essays) Athens: Oxy.
 (2007) Sto Likofos ton Kairon. (In the Twilight of Times, Poetry) Athens: Oxy.
 (2007) Tromos kai Fantasia. (Terror and Fantasy, Comics on Fantasy Literature) Athens: Psichis ta Lampirismata.
 (2007) “To Nekronomikon”, Apagorevmena Vivlia (Forbidden Books) Athens: Archetipo, pp. 75–81.
 (2007) Akatonomastes Exomologiseis. (Unutterable Confessions, Psychological Atmospheric Horror) Athens: Oxy.
 (2007) “Takis Varvitsiotis”, in Timi ston Taki Varvitsioti (A Tribute to Takis Varvitsiotis, Texts on his poetic Work), Various Authors. Thessaloniki: Bibis.
 (2008) “Giati i Poiisi”, 27th symposium of poetry. Patras: Ekdoseis Peri Texnikon.
 (2008) “Ti Akrivos Einai I Tetarti Diastasi” (What Exactly Does The Fourth Dimension Stand For), “Sxetika me to Apeiro” (Issues Related To The Infinity), “Poso Efikto Einai Ena Taxidi ston Xrono” (Is Travelling Through Time An Attainable Objective?), “Oi Neoteres Theories Xronometaforas”, “I Ekpliktiki Xronomixani tou Kathigiti Ronald Malett” (Professor Ronald Malett's Amazing Time Machine) (All Works on the issue of time travelling and the fourth dimension), in Tetarti Diastasi kai Taxidia ston Xrono, Various Authors. Thessaloniki: Arxetypo.
 (2008) The Little Runaways and the House in the Woods (Opera for Children). Montreal and Athens: ChromaMusika and Ekdoseis Hadjilakos.
 (2011) Simandro Afipnisis. (A Gong of Awakening), Poetry. Athens: Pnevmatiki Zoi.
 (2011) Fos sti Siopi. (Light in Silence), Poetry. Athens: Pnevmatiki Zoi.
 (2012) Matomenos Erotas. (Bloody Love), Novel. Athens: Dromon.
 (2013) Mou Eipan. (They talk to me), Interviews. Athens: Dromon.
 (2013) Dokimia ston Evropaiko Politismo, (Essays in European Culture). Athens: Dromon.
 (2014) Nea Atrapos,(New Path). Poetry Athens: Difros.
 (2015) Kostas Davourlis O Pele tis Evropis, (Costas Davourlis, A Pele in Europe). Study, Athens: Dromon.
 (2015) Iroes tou Steliou Anemodoura, (Heros of Stelios Anemodouras). Study, Athens:Mikros Iros.
 (2016) O Manolis Pratikakis sto fos tiw dialektikis, (Manolis Pratikakis of the light of dialectics). Athens: Kedros
 (2017) Laxeftis Topion, (Landscape Carver) Poetry. Athens: Difros.
 (2019) Draculas, i eksomologisi toy, (The confession of Dracula), horror comic. Athens: Dromon.

References

External links
Interview George Pol Papadakis by Takis Varvitsiotis
Γιώργος Πολ. Παπαδάκης, Ονειροπαρμένος
Γιώργος Πολ. Παπαδάκης, Η σκιά
«Μπλεκ», «Ζαγκόρ» & «Μικρός Ήρωας» σε ένα βιβλίο!
Συνέντευξη στο βιβλίο του Γιώργου Πολ. Παπαδάκη "Μου Είπαν..." | Σαράντος Καργάκος
Λέξημα > Λοιπές κατηγορίες > Γιώργος Π. Παπαδάκης :: Lexima.gr

Living people
21st-century Greek poets
Greek male poets
Writers from Athens
21st-century Greek male writers
Year of birth missing (living people)
Greek schoolteachers